AX Circini is a binary star system in the southern constellation of Circinus. It has a nominal magnitude of 5.91, which is bright enough to be visible to the naked eye. The system is moving closer with a heliocentric radial velocity of −21 km/s.

A binary companion was first suspected in 1960, as the spectrum was considered to be composite and there is an ultraviolet excess. The companion was confirmed in 1982, and it was resolved using long baseline interferometry in 2014 and 2015.

The primary, component A, is a yellow-white-hued bright giant with a stellar classification of F8 II, and it is a classical Cepheid variable. The combined apparent magnitude of the system ranges from 5.69 to 6.19 over 5.273 days. The secondary companion, component B, is a main-sequence star with a class of B6 V and an absolute magnitude of about −0.12.

References

F-type bright giants
B-type main-sequence stars
Classical Cepheid variables
Circinus (constellation)
Durchmusterung objects
Circini, 26
130701/2
072773
5527
Circini, AX
Spectroscopic binaries